Iván Buigues Rico (born 10 August 1996) is a Spanish footballer who plays for CF Talavera de la Reina as a goalkeeper.

Club career
Born in Mutxamel, Valencian Community, Buigues played youth football for local Hércules CF from ages 7–12, and finished his development there after a four-year spell with neighbours Valencia CF. On 27 January 2014 he signed a new deal with the club, running until 2016.

On 7 June 2014, while still a junior, Buigues played his first match as a professional, coming on as a late substitute for Oinatz Aulestia in a 1–2 home loss against FC Barcelona B in the Segunda División. He was definitely promoted to the first team in August, initially as second-choice.

In the 2018 off-season, Buigues joined UD Logroñés of the Segunda División B. On 30 January 2020, he moved to CF Talavera de la Reina in the same league after a short spell with amateurs CF Intercity.

References

External links

1996 births
Living people
People from Alacantí
Sportspeople from the Province of Alicante
Spanish footballers
Footballers from the Valencian Community
Association football goalkeepers
Segunda División players
Segunda División B players
Hércules CF players
UD Logroñés players
CF Talavera de la Reina players
CF Intercity players